There are approximately 372,905 listed buildings in England and 2.5% of these are Grade I.   This page is a list of these buildings in the county of Cambridgeshire, by district.

Cambridge

City of Peterborough

|}

East Cambridgeshire

|}

Fenland

|}

Huntingdonshire

|}

South Cambridgeshire

|}

See also
 Grade II* listed buildings in Cambridgeshire

Notes

References

External links

 
Grade I listed